Koteeswarudu is a 1984 Telugu-language action drama film, produced by T. R. Srinivas, P. H. Rama Rao under the Sri Sarath Arts banner and directed by Kommineni Seshagiri Rao. It stars Akkineni Nageswara Rao and Sujatha, with music composed by Chakravarthy.

Cast

Akkineni Nageswara Rao as Krishna
Sujatha as Radha
Jaggayya
Gummadi as Jail Superintendent Mahendra
Sarath Babu as Buchi Babu
Ranganath as S.P.
Nutan Prasad as Paratpara Rao
Mikkilineni as Narayana 
Nagesh
Sakshi Ranga Rao
Chalapati Rao as Manohar
Ch. Krishna Murthy as Gangulu
Sarathi as Lingaiah
Pandari Bai as Shanthamma
Rajasulochana as Rajeswaramma
P. R. Varalakshmi as Koulasya
Jayamalini as item number
Chandrika as Lakshmi

Soundtrack

Music composed by Chakravarthy.

References

1980s Telugu-language films
Indian drama films
Films scored by K. Chakravarthy
Films directed by Kommineni Seshagiri Rao